Mimi Areme (September 28, 1988) is a Ghanaian beauty queen who was crowned as Miss Ghana 2009. Areme later competed in the Miss World 2010 pageant in the southern Chinese city of Sanya on October 30, where Miss USA, Alexandria Mills, was crowned the overall winner.

Miss Ghana 2009
Twenty-year-old Miss Mimi Areme, an HND Marketing student of the Sunyani Polytechnic, was elected Miss Ghana 2009 at the grand finale of the national pageant at the Accra International Conference Centre.

As part of her pageant prize, Ms. Areme drove home a new Tata Safari 4X4 automobile. The car keys were handed to her by the Minister of Tourism, Mrs Juliana Azumah-Mensah, moments after Areme was declared Ghana's 2009 beauty queen by 2008 winner, Miss Mawuse Appea. The car prize included a one-year servicing warranty from PHC Motors. Areme also received a GHc200 monthly allowance for one year, 10 gallons of fuel per week for one year, four pieces of ATL fabric every month for one year, and several other alluring indulgences. As Miss Ghana, Areme also became entitled to represent Ghana in the Miss World Pageant.

Besides her poise and articulation, amplified by her beauty and regular smiles, Areme was equally strong with her message, re-echoing US president Barack Obama's challenge to Africa's youth to take their destinies into their own hands and dare themselves to overcome whatever challenges confront the continent. Her emphatic “Yes we can!” resonated in the main auditorium as her many fans stood in brief applause.

Miss World 2010
Areme won the title of Miss Ghana 2009 on September 26, 2009, 2 days before her birthday. After winning this pageant, she represented her country at the 60th Miss World Anniversary which was held in Sanya, China on October 30, 2010. She competed with 114 women from around the world.

Although she did not placed as one of the 25 semifinalists, she made her country proud of her. She did well in some Fast Tracks including placing in the Top 20 on Miss World Beach Beauty and Top Model. She also became the 1st Runner Up of Beauty With A Purpose about children trafficking and the modern slave trade.

After Miss World
After the Miss World 2010 pageant, Areme returned to her native country, Ghana. She continued her study in the field of marketing at Ghana Institute of Management and Public Administration (GIMPA). She also continued her program Beauty With A Purpose by building a charitable organization named "Areme Gives Back".
She now works as Emirates cabin crew.

References

External links
Miss World official website
Mimi Areme's Profile in Miss World Website
Miss Ghana Official Website
Mimi Areme's Official Twitter
Areme Gives Back's Official Website

Miss World 2010 delegates
Living people
1988 births
Ghanaian beauty pageant winners
Ghana Institute of Management and Public Administration alumni
Sunyani Technical University alumni